Late Night Tales: Nightmares on Wax is a DJ mix album, mixed by Nightmares on Wax, released as part of Late Night Tales' Late Night Tales / Another Late Night DJ series.

Track listing
 "Midnight Marauders" - Joe Dukie & DJ Fitchie
 "Gravy Train" (N.O.W. Mix) - Ian Brown
 "Every Season" (feat. Damon Albarn) - Tony Allen
 "Show Me Some Love" - The Rootsman
 "California Suite" (Vagabond Mix) - King Kooba
 "Listen (What It Is)" - Quincy Jones
 "La Rue" - Cortex
 "Sneakin' in the Back" - Tom Scott
 "Action Tape 1" (Aim Madscope Mix) - Search
 "Bout That Time" - Large Professor
 "Cantamilla" - Tranquility Bass
 "Intergalacticthrowdown" - Mad Doctor X
 "Spooky" - Dusty Springfield
 "Having Your Fun" - Focus
 "Brothers on the Slide Dub" - Nightmares on Wax
 "The White City Part 1" - read by Brian Blessed

Nightmares on Wax
2003 compilation albums